Cabo de Santa Maria may refer to:
 Cabo de Santa Maria (Cape Verde), a cape in Cape Verde
 Cabo de Santa Maria (Faro), the southernmost point of mainland Portugal